Athanasios "Thanasis" Papachatzis (also spelled Thanassis; ; born September 11, 1969) is a Greek basketball coach.

Coaching career

Clubs
Papachatzis started his coaching career when he was just 20 years old for the academies of Maroussi for three seasons (1989–90, 1990–91 and 1991–92). After, he moved to Dafnis for the 1994–95 season. In 1995 he moved to Panathinaikos as an assistant coach, where he won 2 Greek League Championships, 1 Greek Cup and 1 EuroLeague. Next years he moved to many teams as an assistant coach Panionios, Aris, Olympiacos, AEK Athens and back to Aris. For 2011–12 season he moved to Russia for Lokomotiv Kuban as an assistant coach. After this season he came back in Greece for Panionios and he became an assistant coach, under head coach Ioannis Sfairopoulos.

On March 15, 2017, Papachatzis moved to AEK Athens to become an assistant coach, under head coach Sotiris Manolopoulos.

Awards and accomplishments

As Assistant coach
 EuroLeague: 1 (with Panathinaikos: 1996)
 2x Greek League Champion: (1998, 1999)
 Greek Cup Winner: (1996)

References

1969 births
Living people
Apollon Patras B.C. coaches
Greek basketball coaches
Greek expatriate basketball people in the United States
Sportspeople from Athens